The Curtiss Model L was a triplane trainer aircraft in the United States in 1916 by the Curtiss Aeroplane Company of Hammondsport, New York.

Development
It was a largely conventional design with the upper two wings of equal span and a shorter-span lower wing, the Model L had a wide, open cockpit that accommodated the student and instructor side by side, an unusual feature for its time which gained the aircraft the nickname "Sociable Triplane". Apart from private sales, Curtiss sold a number to both the United States Army and Navy. These differed from their civil counterparts in having lower wings of equal span to the upper two. The three sold to the Navy were equipped as floatplanes.

The wings from one of the Army's examples were mated to the fuselage of a Curtiss Jenny to produce the single example of the X-1 trainer. Model L wings were also used by Curtiss for the creation of the Autoplane roadable aircraft, as well as being mated to a Model F hull to create the Curtiss FL.

Variants
 Model L - civil trainer version
 Model L-1 - military version
 Model L-2 - military version, some equipped with floats

Operators

United States Army
United States Navy

Specifications

References

 
 aerofiles.com

1910s United States civil trainer aircraft
Model L
Triplanes
Single-engined tractor aircraft
Aircraft first flown in 1916